James Stanek (born August 5, 1971) is an American theatre, film, and television actor.

Early life
Stanek was born in Havre de Grace, Maryland and raised in Cranberry Township, Butler County, Pennsylvania, a suburb of Pittsburgh. He attended the Seneca Valley School District where he performed in such musicals as Grease and Little Shop of Horrors, among others. In Stanek's senior year of high school he auditioned for, and was accepted, into the Mini Stars musical theatre program at the Pittsburgh Civic Light Opera. 

He attended and graduated from Carnegie Mellon University.

Personal life
Stanek and his wife, Beth, currently reside in Manhattan, where they raise their three sons.

Theatre credits

Broadway, Off-Broadway, and Tour Theatre

Regional theatre 
 "Roman Holiday" (The Guthrie Theater [Minneapolis, MN])
 Ace (Signature Theatre)
 The Producers (North Shore Music Theatre)
 Carnival (Kennedy Center)
 Lestat (Curran Theatre)
 My Fair Lady (McCarter Theatre Center)
 The Threepenny Opera (Williamstown Theatre Festival)
 Damn Yankees (American Musical Theatre of San Jose)
 Chrysalis (Adirondack Theatre Festival)
 The Three Musketeers (American Musical Theatre of San Jose)
 Let's Face It (New York Historical Society)
 Thoroughly Modern Millie (La Jolla Playhouse)
 Purlie (Kennedy Center)
 Pippin (Bay Street Theatre)
 Mame (Pittsburgh Civic Light Opera)
 George M! (St. Louis MUNY)

Filmography

Discography
 Kitty's Kisses (Original Studio Cast)
 Frankenstein (Original Off-Broadway Cast)
 Lestat (Original Broadway Cast)
 The 3hree Musketeers (Original American Cast)
 A Funny Thing Happened on the Way to the Forum (1996 Broadway Revival Cast)

The Lestat original Broadway cast recording was recorded by Mercury Records on May 22, 2006 at Sony Studios in New York City. Planned release was July 11, 2006 but has been postponed indefinitely. In August 2006 after numerous rumors of an August release date, Elton John's website released this statement:

"We have received many messages asking when the Lestat cast album will be released. According to Elton's management, there are no plans to release the album at present."

The cast album has still yet to be released.

References

External links
 
 
 Star File on Broadway.com
 Jim Stanek Online: The Fansite

1975 births
American male musical theatre actors
American male stage actors
Carnegie Mellon University alumni
Living people
Male actors from Pittsburgh
People from Butler County, Pennsylvania
People from Havre de Grace, Maryland